Amédée Domenech (May 3, 1933, Narbonne – September 21, 2003 Brive-la-Gaillarde) was a French rugby union prop. He played for RC Vichy between 1954 and 1955. After one year he moved to CA Brive and helped the club to gain promotion to the first division. He earned his first cap with the French national team on 27 March 1954 against Wales at Cardiff.  He was nicknamed Le Duc (the Duke). The Stade Amédée-Domenech in Brive-la-Gaillarde was named in his honour.

After his playing career, Domenech became a businessman and a politician. Most notably he was a regional president of the Radical Party and a city councillor (conseiller municipal) in Brive-la-Gaillarde and Paris. He was also part of Edgar Faure's cabinet.

Honours 
 Selected to represent France, 1954–1963
Five Nations 1954, 1955, 1960, 1961 and 1962.
1961 France rugby union tour of New Zealand and Australia
1960 France rugby union tour of Argentina and Uruguay

References

External links
ESPN profile

1933 births
2003 deaths
French people of Catalan descent
French rugby union players
France international rugby union players
Radical Party (France) politicians
French sportsperson-politicians
People from Narbonne
Sportspeople from Aude
Rugby union props